Le Griffon  (The Griffin) was a sailing vessel built by René-Robert Cavelier, Sieur de La Salle in 1679.

Le Griffon was constructed and launched at or near Cayuga Island on the Niagara River and was armed with seven cannons. The exact size and construction of Le Griffon is not known but many researchers believe she was a 45-ton barque. She was the largest sailing vessel on the Great Lakes up to that time. La Salle and Father Louis Hennepin set out on Le Griffons maiden voyage on 7 August 1679 with a crew of 32, sailing across Lake Erie, Lake Huron and Lake Michigan through uncharted waters that only canoes had previously explored. The ship landed on an island in Lake Michigan where the local tribes had gathered with animal pelts to trade with the French. La Salle disembarked and on 18 September sent the ship back toward Niagara. On its return trip from the island, said to be located in the mouth of the body of water which is now known as Green Bay, it vanished with all six crew members and its load of furs.

While there have been many theories over the years, there is no clear consensus as to the fate or current location of Le Griffon.

Historical context
Le Griffon was the largest fixed-rig sailing vessel on the Great Lakes up to that time, and led the way to modern commercial shipping in that part of the world. Historian J. B. Mansfield reported that this "excited the deepest emotions of the Indian tribes, then occupying the shores of these inland waters".

French explorer René Robert Cavelier, Sieur de La Salle, sought a Northwest Passage to China and Japan to extend France's trade.  Creating a fur trade monopoly with the Native Americans would finance his quest and building Le Griffon was an "essential link in the scheme".  While work continued on Le Griffon in the spring of 1679 as soon as the ice began to break up along the shores of Lake Erie, La Salle sent out men from Fort Frontenac in 15 canoes laden with supplies and merchandise to trade with the Illinois for furs at the trading posts of the upper Huron and Michigan Lakes.

First ships and preparations 
Le Griffon may or may not be considered the first ship on the Great Lakes, depending on what factors one deems necessary to qualify a vessel for that designation. Decking, permanent masts, and bearing a name are a few of the criteria one might use.

Before 1673, the most common vessel on the lakes was the canoe. While some of these were made from a single carved log ("dugout" or "pirogue"), most were bark canoes. Bateaux were also common. While they were at times fitted with mast and sails, their primary propulsion was either oars or poles. The sails were merely supplemental for traveling down wind. Their inefficiency at beating to windward made them impractical as sailing vessels, and they were not very safe in open water.

Below Niagara Falls: first ships on Lake Ontario
James Mansfield says that in the fall of 1678, La Salle built a vessel of about 10 tons burden at Fort Frontenac and that this vessel, named Frontenac, was the first real sailing vessel on the Great Lakes; specifically, on Lake Ontario (which some at the time called Lac de Frontenac). Many authors since Mansfield have followed suit. There is reason, however, to question his assertion.

Justin Windsor notes that Count Frontenac by 1 August 1673, "had already ordered the construction of a vessel on Ontario to be used as an auxiliary force to Fort Frontenac." He also says that at Fort Frontenac in 1676, La Salle "laid the keels of the vessels which he depended on to frighten the English." J. C. Mills  quotes a letter from La Salle to the Minister of Marine that says, "The fort at Cataraqui (Fort Frontenac) with the aid of a vessel now building, will command Lake Ontario..." While no date is given for the letter, the location of Mill's reference to it suggests that it was sent before 1677, perhaps as early as 1675. Francis Parkman says that by 1677, "four vessels of 25 to 40 tons had been built for the lake Ontario and the river St. Lawrence." H. W. Beckwith says that in September 1678, La Salle "already had three small vessels on Lake Ontario, which he had made use of in a coasting trade with the Indians." None of these sources ascribe a name to any of these vessels. While the journals of Tonti, Hennepin, and LeClercq (participants with La Salle) do mention a little vessel of 10 tons, none of them apply a name to it.

Above Niagara Falls: Le Griffon
La Salle's prime focus in 1678 was building Le Griffon. Arriving at Fort Frontenac in late September, he had neither the time for nor the interest in building a vessel at Fort Frontenac to transport building materials, some of which he had recently obtained in France, to a site above Niagara Falls where he could build his new ship. Beckwith's conclusion was that he chose one of his existing vessels, one of about ten tons burden, for sending the first group of men to Niagara. Some of La Salle's associates called this vessel a brigantine; others called it a bark. The accounts agree that this little vessel played a part in the building of Le Griffon.

On 18 November 1678, after just over a month of preparations at Fort Frontenac, La Salle dispatched Captain La Motte and Father Louis Hennepin together with 15 men and supplies in a vessel of 10 tons. Their mission was to begin selecting a site for the construction of Le Griffon and to erect necessary structures for shelter, storage, and defense. Because the wind was strong from the north, they sailed close to the north shore of the lake, putting in for the nights in various bays along the way. Somewhere near present-day Toronto they were frozen in and had to chop their way out of the ice. From there they struck out across the lake toward the mouth of the Niagara River. They arrived late on 5 December, but the weather was rough and they did not want to run the surf and outflow of the river at night, so they stayed a few miles off shore. On 6 December, they landed safely on the east bank of the river at about where Lewiston, New York is today. They attempted to sail further upstream, but the current was too strong. Ice flowing down the river threatened to damage their little brigantine and after a cable was broken, they hauled the vessel ashore and into a small ravine for protection.

La Salle's men first had to build their lodging and then guard against the Iroquois who were hostile to this invasion of their ancient homeland. La Salle had instructed Hennepin and La Motte to go  into wilderness in knee-deep snow on an embassy to the great village of the Seneca tribe, bringing gifts and promises in order to obtain their good will to build "the big canoe" (Le Griffon), but many tribal members did not approve. They wished to secure a reliable truce lest the natives interfere with their projects. Those left behind proceeded with needed building projects. Negotiations with the Senecas were only moderately successful, so when they left the village they still wondered if the natives would permit them to finish their project. They reached Niagara again on 14 January.

Meanwhile, La Salle and Henri de Tonti, had departed Fort Frontenac in a second vessel some days after La Motte and Hennepin. This was a "great bark" (Hennepin's words) of about 20 tons burden – although Tonti's journal says this was a 40-ton vessel. The vessel carried anchors, chain, guns, cordage, and cable for Le Griffon, as well as supplies and provisions for the anticipated journey. La Salle followed the southern shore of the lake. La Salle decided to visit the Senecas at Tagarondies himself. He put ashore near present-day Rochester, New York, and arrived at Tagarondies very shortly after La Motte and Hennepin had left. He was more successful in securing the Indians' tolerance of his proposed "big canoe" and support buildings. There was some disagreement between La Salle and the ship's pilot, and La Salle and Tonti went ahead on foot to Niagara. When they arrived there La Motte and Hennepin had not yet returned. While there La Salle selected a site for building Le Griffon.

After La Salle and Tonti left, the pilot and the rest of the crew were to follow with the supply vessel. On 8 January 1679, the pilot and crew decided to spend the night ashore where they could light a fire and sleep in some warmth. It was a calm night and they believed the vessel was securely moored. When a strong wind suddenly arose, they could not make it back to the ship. The vessel dragged its anchor for about nine miles to the east before grounding and breaking up near present-day Thirty Mile Point.  When La Salle heard of the loss (through a messenger or one of the natives), he left Niagara and joined in the salvage effort. They recovered the anchors, chain, and most of the materials critical for Le Griffon, but most of the supplies and provisions were lost. They dragged the materials to the mouth of the Niagara, rested and warmed up a few days in an Indian village, then carried the materials single file through the snow to their settlement above the falls.

La Salle arrived on 20 January 1679 from Fort Frontenac with the full rigging, anchors, chains, cordage, and cannon that were transported by barge, then salvaged and dragged  overland to the construction site. La Salle oversaw the laying of Le Griffon's keel and drove her first bolt.  Crude tools, green and wet timbers, and the cold winter months caused slow progress in the construction of Le Griffon. La Salle left Italian officer Henri de Tonti and Father Hennepin in charge while he journeyed to Fort Frontenac to secure replacements for lost supplies.

The site La Salle had selected for building Le Griffon has conclusively been identified as at or near the mouth of Cayuga Creek, at Cayuga Island. There the keel was laid on 26 January 1679. La Salle offered Hennepin the honor of driving the first spike, but Hennepin deferred to his leader. Having lost needed supplies, La Salle left the building of Le Griffon under Tonti's care, and set out on foot to return to Fort Frontenac. While frozen rivers made traveling easy, finding food was not. He arrived there nearly starved only to find that his detractors had succeeded in stirring up doubt and opposition with his creditors. Addressing his problems long delayed his return to the expedition.

After La Salle's departure, Tonti refloated the little brigantine, and attempted to use it for more salvage work at the wreck, but the winter weather prevented success. He then charged La Motte with salvage by use of canoes. Some time later, Hennepin would use this little vessel to sail to Fort Frontenac and again back to Niagara.

Progress on Le Griffon was fraught with problems. Suffering from cold and low on supplies, the men were close to mutiny. The uneasy truce with the Indians was tested by threats and attempts of sabotage and murder. Tonti learned of a plan to burn the ship before it could be launched, so he launched ahead of schedule and Le Griffon entered the waters in early May 1679.

A female Native informant who was of the tribe foiled the plans of hostile Senecas to burn Le Griffon as she grew on her stocks.  The unrest of the Seneca and dissatisfied workmen were continually incited by secret agents of merchants and traders who feared La Salle would break their monopoly on the fur trade. When the Seneca again threatened to burn the ship, she was launched earlier than planned in Cayuga Creek channel of the upper Niagara River with ceremony and the roar of her cannons.  A party from the Iroquois tribe who witnessed the launching were so impressed by the "large floating fort" that they named the French builders Ot-kon, meaning "penetrating minds", which corresponds to the Seneca word Ot-goh, meaning supernatural beings or spirits.  The tumultuous sound of Le Griffon's cannons so amazed the Native Americans that the Frenchmen were able to sleep at ease for the first time in months when they anchored off shore.  
After Le Griffon was launched, she was rigged with sails and provisioned with seven cannon of which two were brass.  The French flag flew above the cabin placed on top of the main deck that was elevated above the hull. She had the figure of a griffin mounted on her jib-boom and an eagle flying above. 
Some say Le Griffon was named for Count Frontenac whose coat of arms was ornamented with the mythical griffin.  Hennepin said she was named to protect her from the fire that threatened her.

Construction

Le Griffons pattern closely followed the prevailing type used by explorers to cross the Atlantic Ocean to the New World. The exact size and construction of Le Griffon is not known.

Hennepin's first account says she was a vessel of about 45 tons; his second says 60 tons. Because his second account has numerous exaggerations and cases where he credits himself for things that La Salle had done, Hennepin's first account is considered more reliable. In any case, Le Griffon was larger than any other vessel on the lakes at the time, and as far as contemporary reports can confirm, the first named vessel.

Maiden voyage

Niagara River to Saginaw Bay

In July 1679, La Salle directed 12 men to tow Le Griffon through the rapids of the Niagara River with long lines stretched from the bank.  They moored in quiet water off Squaw Island three miles from Lake Erie waiting for favorable northeast winds. La Salle sent Tonti ahead on 22 July 1679 with a few selected men, canoes, and trading goods to secure furs and supplies. Le Griffon set off on 7 August with unfurled sails, a 34-man crew, and a salute from her cannon and musketry.  They were navigating Le Griffon through uncharted waters that only canoes had previously explored.  They made their way around Long Point, Ontario, constantly sounding  as they went through the first moonless, fog-laden night to the sound of breaking waves and guided only by La Salle's knowledge of Galinée's crude, 10-year-old chart. They sailed across the open water of Lake Erie whose shores were forested and "unbroken by the faintest signs of civilization". They reached the mouth of the Detroit River on 10 August 1679 where they were greeted by three columns of smoke signaling the location of Tonti's camp whom they received on board.  They entered Lake St. Clair on 12 August, the feast day of Saint Clare of Assisi, and named the lake after her.  They again sounded their way through the narrow channel of the St. Clair River to its mouth where they were delayed by contrary winds until 24 August. For the second time, they used a dozen men and ropes to tow Le Griffon over the rapids of the St. Clair River into lower Lake Huron. They made their way north and west to Saginaw Bay on Lake Huron where they were becalmed until noon of 25 August.  La Salle took personal command at this point due to evidence that the pilot was negligent.

Lake Huron storm

On noon of 25 August they started out northwest with a favoring northerly wind.  When the wind suddenly veered to the southeast they changed course to avoid Presque Isle.  However, the ferocity of the gale forced them to retreat windward and lie-to until morning.  By 26 August the violence of the gale caused them to "haul down their topmasts, to lash their yards to the deck, and drift at the mercy of storm.  At noon the waves ran so high, and the lake became so rough, as to compel them to stand in for land."  
Father Hennepin wrote that during the fearful crisis of the storm, La Salle vowed that if God would deliver them, the first chapel erected in Louisiana would be dedicated to the memory of Saint Anthony of Padua, the patron of the sailor.  The wind did slightly decrease but they drifted slowly all night, unable to find anchorage or shelter.  They were driven northwesterly until the evening of 27 August when under a light southerly breeze they finally rounded Bois Blanc Island and anchored in the calm waters of the natural harbor at East Moran Bay off the settlement of Mission St. Ignace, where there was a settlement of Hurons, Ottawas, and a few Frenchmen.

St. Ignace

Upon Le Griffons safe arrival at St. Ignace, the voyagers fired a salute from her deck that the Hurons on shore volleyed three times with their firearms.  More than 100 Native American bark canoes gathered around Le Griffon to look at the "big wood canoe".  La Salle dressed in a scarlet cloak bordered with lace and a highly plumed cap, laid aside his arms in charge of a sentinel and attended mass with his crew in the chapel of the Ottawas and then made a visit of ceremony with the chiefs.

La Salle found some of the 15 men he sent ahead from Fort Frontenac to trade with the Illinois but they had listened to La Salle's enemies who said he would never reach the Straits of Mackinac.  La Salle seized two of the deserters and sent Tonti with six men to arrest two more at Sault Ste. Marie.

Green Bay

The short open-water season of the upper Great Lakes compelled La Salle to depart for Green Bay on 12 September, five days before Tonti's return.  They sailed from the Straits of Mackinac to an island (either Washington Island or Rock Island) located at the entrance of Green Bay. They anchored on the south shore of the island and found it occupied by friendly Pottawatomies and 15 of the fur traders La Salle sent ahead.  The traders had collected  of furs in anticipation of the arrival of Le Griffon. La Salle decided to stay behind with four canoes to explore the head of Lake Michigan.  La Salle gave instructions for Le Griffon to off-load merchandise for him at Mackinac that would be picked up on the return trip.  Le Griffon rode out a violent storm for four days and then on 18 September, the pilot Luc and five crew sailed under a favorable wind for the Niagara River with a parting salute from a single gun. She carried a cargo of furs valued at from 50,000 to 60,000 francs ($10,000 – $12,000) and the rigging and anchors for another vessel that La Salle intended to build to find passage to the West Indies.  La Salle never saw Le Griffon again.

Shipwreck

Father Hennepin wrote that Le Griffon was lost in a violent storm. Some charged fur traders, and even Jesuits with her destruction.  Some said that the Ottawas or Pottawatomies boarded her, murdered her crew, and then burned her.  La Salle was convinced that the pilot and crew treacherously sank her and made off with the goods.  There is no conclusive evidence about any of the theories about Le Griffons loss.

Le Griffon is reported to be the "Holy Grail" of Great Lakes shipwreck hunters.  A number of sunken old sailing ships have been suggested to be Le Griffon but, except for the ones proven to be other ships, there has been no positive identification. One candidate is a wreck at the western end of Manitoulin Island in Lake Huron, with another wreck near Escanaba, Michigan, also proposed.

Le Griffon is considered by some to have been the first ship lost on the Great Lakes. It was another vessel used by La Salle and Tonti, however, that was the first loss on 8 January 1679. As noted above, sources give its size as either 20 tons or 40 tons. It dragged anchor and ran aground near Thirty Mile Point on Lake Ontario, where it broke apart. Some say that this vessel was named the Frontenac, while others say the other vessel used on La Salle's expedition was Frontenac. Some sources confuse the two vessels.

Le Griffon may have been found by the Great Lakes Exploration Group but the potential remains were the subject of lawsuits involving the discoverers, the state of Michigan, the U.S. federal government, and the Government of France. In July 2010 the Great Lakes Exploration Group issued a press release stating that they, the state of Michigan and France had reached agreement to co-operate in the next phase of an archaeological site assessment for identifying the shipwreck. After years of legal squabbles the Michigan Department of Natural Resources issued a permit, and on 16 June 2013, an underwater pit was dug allowing US and French archeologists to examine the object for the first time. They discovered a 15-inch slab of blackened wood that might have been a human-fashioned cultural artifact. On 19 June 2013, teams of scientists determined the wood pole discovered was not attached to a ship, after it came loose and was placed on the lake bed during an excavation. They concluded it was likely a bowsprit dating from a ship hundreds of years old, although some think it was a common pound net stake used for fishing nets in the 19th century. At the time, no other wreckage was found, but scientists noted other wreckage may not be far away.

On 23 June 2014, Steve Libert told the Associated Press he believed he found Le Griffon in Lake Michigan after extensive searching, in a debris field near where a wood slab was found the previous year. Steve and Kathie Libert have since published a book, Le Griffon and the Huron Islands - 1679: Our Story of Exploration and Discovery (Mission Point Press, 2021).

On 27 December 2014, two divers, Kevin Dykstra and Frederick Monroe, announced the discovery of a wreck that they believe is Le Griffon, based on the bowstem, which to some resembles an ornamental griffin. Their claim was quickly debunked when Michigan authorities dove down on 9 June 2015 after receiving the coordinates to verify its authenticity.  Michigan state maritime archaeologist Wayne R. Lusardi presented evidence that the wreck was, in fact, a tugboat due to its  length and presence of a steam boiler.

There has yet to be any consensus regarding the location of the shipwreck of Le Griffon. A 2015 book The Wreck of the Griffon by Cris Kohl and Joan Forsberg argues that the best "discovery" proposed to date remains the 1898 find by Albert Cullis, lighthouse keeper on the western edge of Manitoulin Island in northern Lake Huron. While they recognize that conclusive evidence has not been found, the evidence that has been found there fits with what is known of the history of that time and they postulate that if Le Griffon is found elsewhere, that would deepen the mystery of the find by Cullis.

Notes

References

Further reading

External links

The Search for the Elusive Griffon

Great Lakes ships
Shipwrecks of Lake Michigan
Merchant ships of Canada
1670s ships
New France
Ships lost with all hands
Ships built in France
Ships built in New York (state)